Hilty is a surname. Notable people with the surname include:

Bill Hilty (born 1938), American politician
Carl Hilty (1833–1909), Swiss philosopher, writer and lawyer
Joan Hilty (born 1966), American cartoonist
Leonard Hilty (1896–1978), American football player
Megan Hilty (born 1981), American actress and singer